Chilinoidea is a superfamily of air-breathing freshwater snails, pulmonate gastropod mollusks in the clade Hygrophila.

References

Panpulmonata